Virginia Ruano Pascual and Paola Suárez were the defending champions and successfully defended their title, by defeating Martina Navratilova and Lisa Raymond 6–4, 6–1 in the final.

It was the 26th title for Ruano Pascual and the 33rd for Suárez in their respective careers. It was also the 3rd title for the pair during the season, after their wins in the Australian Open and Indian Wells.

Seeds
The first four seeds received a bye into the second round.

Draw

Finals

Top half

Bottom half

External links
 Main and Qualifying draws

Family Circle Cup
Charleston Open